Johann Friedrich Reiffenstein(born 22 November 1719, Ragnit, – died 6 October 1793, Rome) was a German cicerone for grand tourists, painter, antiquarian and agent for art collectors in Rome.

References 

 C. Frank, in Figure Humaine et Architecture. Dessins di XVIIIe au Xe Siècle, Rome, Galleria Carlo Virgilio & C., 2017, pp. 18–19, Reffenstein, Pastel portrait of a lady.
 B. von Götz-Mohr, »Amico Optimo« Franz Graf zu Erbach-Erbach (1754-1823), Johann Friedrich Reiffenstein (1719-1793) und die Antikesammlungen in Erbach im Odenwald, in Das Modell in der bildenden Kunst des Mittelalters und der Neuzeit. Festschrift für Herbert Beck, Petersberg, Michael Imhof Verlag, 2006.

1719 births
1793 deaths
People from Neman, Russia
German classical scholars
19th-century German painters
19th-century German male artists
German male painters
German antiquarians
People from East Prussia
German male non-fiction writers